The Sultans Trail is a long-distance footpath from Vienna to Istanbul. The path passes through Austria, Slovakia, Hungary, Croatia, Serbia, Romania, Bulgaria, East Macedonia and Thrace in northern Greece, and Turkey.

History
Sultans Trail (recte Sultan's) takes its name from sultan Süleyman Kanuni, Suleiman the Magnificent, of the Ottoman Empire who led Ottoman armies to conquer Belgrade and most of Hungary before his invasion was checked at the Siege of Vienna. The main path follows the route of sultan Suleiman the Magnificent on his way to Vienna. He started on 10 May 1529 from Istanbul and arrived 23 September 1529 in Vienna (141 days). It was to be the Ottoman Empire's most ambitious expedition to the west, but the Austrian garrison inflicted upon Suleiman his first defeat. A second attempt to conquer Vienna failed in 1532. In 1566, at the age of 60, the sultan led his army for the last time; he died close to Szigetvár in Hungary.

In contrast to its past the Sultan's Trail nowadays forms a path of peace, a meeting place for people of all faiths and cultures. The trail starts at St. Stephen's Cathedral in the centre of Vienna; the bells of this church are made from the melted iron of Ottoman cannons. It ends at the tomb of the Sultan in Istanbul. The Sultan’s Trail was developed by volunteers from the Netherlands-based NGO Sultans Trail – A European Cultural Route.

Apart from the Romanian and Bulgarian mountains, the trail can be walked all year round. Most parts of the route have ample accommodation such as hotels, pensions or private rooms. In parts of Hungary and Bulgaria a tent is necessary.

In popular culture
In 2020, BBC broadcast series three of Pilgrimage: The Road to Istanbul which was about the Sultans Trail.

Route of the Sultans Trail
Austria Main route: Vienna-Simmering, Schwechat, Rauchenwarth, Trautmannsdorf an der Leitha, Wilfleinsdorf, Bruck an der Leitha, Rohrau, Petronell-Carnuntum, Hainburg an der Donau, Wolfsthal.

Austria – Purbach route: Wien-Simmering, Schwechat, Rauchenwarth, Trautmannsdorf an der Leitha, Sommerein, Breitenbrunn am Neusiedler See, Purbach am Neusiedler See, Donnerskirchen, Eisenstadt, St. Margarethen im Burgenland, Mörbisch am See, in Hungary Fertőrákos, Sopron, Brennbergbánya, back again in Austria, Ritzing, Lackenbach, Weppersdorf, St.Martin, Kaisersdorf, Drassmarkt, Weingraben, Karl, Oberrabnitz, Piringsdorf, Mannersdorf an der Rabnitz, Klostermarienberg  .

Slovakia Main route: Devin, Bratislava, Čunovo, Vojka nad Dunajom, Gabčíkovo, Malé Kosihy, Komárno, Iža, Radvaň nad Dunajom-Žitava, Radvaň nad Dunajom, Moča, Kravany nad Dunajom, Obid, Štúrovo

Slovakia – Romantic route of Omar and Fatima: Devin, Bratislava, Marianka, Modra, Harmónia, Častá, Dobrá Voda, Prašník, Vrbové, Čachtice, Nové Mesto nad Váhom, Beckov, Trenčín, Topoľčany, Nitra, Nové Zámky, Kolárovo, Kameničná,

Hungary Main route: Halászi, Győr, Tata, Tatabánya, Annavölgy, Esztergom, Szentendre, Budakalász, Budapest, Százhalombatta, Székesfehérvár, Dunaföldvár, Szekszárd, Bátaszék, Mohács, Sátorhely, Udvar.

MATS Balaton route (till Mohács):: Sopron, Brennbergbánya, to Austria, Ritzing, Lackenbach, Weppersdorf, St.Martin, Kaisersdorf, Drassmarkt, Weingraben, Karl, Oberrabnitz, Piringsdorf, Mannersdorf an der Rabnitz, Klostermarienberg, back to Hungary Köszeg, Sárvár, Sümeg, Keszthely, Szuliman, Csertő, Szigetvár, Pécs, Mohács, Sátorhely, Udvar.

Croatia Main route: Topolje, Draž, Podolje, Popovac, Beli Manastir, Karanac, Kneževi Vinogradi, Grabovac, Darda, Osijek, Đakovo, Vinkovci, Vukovar, Šarengrad, Opatovac, Ilok.

Serbia Main route: Bačka Palanka, Morović, Sremska Mitrovica, Mačvanska Mitrovica, Jarak, Šabac, Belgrade, Grocka, Smederevo, Smederevska Palanka, Svilajnac, Despotovac, Paraćin, Kruševac, Niš, Niška Banja, Bela Palanka, Pirot, Dimitrovgrad.

Serbia Carski Drum route (till Belgrade):Bački Breg, Bezdan, Bački Monoštor, Sombor, Apatin, Bač,  Bačka Palanka,  Novi Sad, Petrovaradin, Sremski Karlovci, Krušedol Selo, Šatrinci, Dobrodol, Ljukovo, Golubinci, Vojka, Novi Banovci, Zemun.

Romania Main route: Timișoara, Hunedoara, Deva, Alba Iulia, Sibiu, Pitesti, Bucharest, Giurgiu,

Bulgaria Main route: Kalotina, Dragoman, Sofia, Novi Han, Ihtiman, Pazardzhik, Stamboliyski, Plovdiv, Sadovo, Parvomay, Mineralni Bani, Haskovo, Harmanli, Lyubimets, Svilengrad.

Bulgaria Mübadele route (after Sofia): Vitosha, Samokov, Rila Monastery, Rila, Velingrad, Borino, Trigrad, Mugla, Smoljan, Madan, Ardino, Kardzjali, Ivaylovgrad.

Greece Main route (all located in East Macedonia and Thrace): Ormenio, Dikaia, Marasia, Kastanies

Greece mübadele route (after Ivaylovgrad): Kyprinos, Komara, Fylakio, Elaia, Plati, Arzos Rizia, Kastanies

Turkey Main route: Kapıkule, Kemalköy, Karabulut, Sarayakpınar, (Sırpsındığı), Avarız, Edirne, Kösençiftliği, Söğütlüdere, Hasköy, Hamzabey, Uluçınar, Karlı, Hallaçlı, Çatalca, Dursunköy, Sazlıbosna, Hacımaşlı, Pirinçci, Eyüp Sultan Mosque, Fatih and Süleymaniye Mosque in Istanbul.

Turkey avyolu route (after Edirne): Hıdırağa, Karayusuf, Turkye, Karayusuf, Ortakça, Kavaklı, Yağcılı, Süloğlu, Büyük Gerdelli, Dolhan, Paşayeri, Koyunbaba, Kırklareli, Kızılcıkdere, Üsküpdere, Karıncak, Kaynarca, Pınarhisar, Erenler, Poyralı, Doğanca, Develi, Vize, Çakıllı, Kavacık, Saray, Küçük Yoncalı, Safaalan, Binkılıç, Aydınlar, Yaylacık, Gümüşpınar, İhsaniye, Akalan, Dağyenice, Boyalık, Dursunköy, (after Dursunköy the same route as above).

References

External links
 Official Sultans Trail website
 Official Sultans Trail website in Serbian Language
 Overview of cultural Routes in Turkey
 Sultanstrail and Sufipath united
 Article about the Sultans Trail in Zaman.

Books 
 Journal of Suleiman the Magnificent during 1. siege of Vienna  German Language
 Sultan's Trail wandelgids – Wandelen in Thracië. Sedat Çakır, 2011. . Dutch Language guide book of Turkish part of Sultans Trail.

European long-distance paths
Hiking trails in Europe
Hiking trails in Turkey
Hiking trails in Greece
Hiking trails in Bulgaria
Hiking trails in Romania
Hiking trails in Serbia
Hiking trails in Croatia
Hiking trails in Hungary
Hiking trails in Slovakia
Hiking trails in Austria